John Archibald Murray Macdonald (9 October 1854 – 16 January 1939) was a Scottish Liberal Party politician.

Biography
The fourth son of the Rev. H. F. Macdonald DD, Strachur, Argyllshire, he was educated at Glasgow High School, the University of Glasgow and the University of Edinburgh. In 1885 he married Alice Mary Noel, daughter of Edward H. Noel.

He was Liberal Member of Parliament for Bow and Bromley from 1892 to 1895, for Falkirk Burghs from 1906 to 1918 and for Stirling and Falkirk Burghs from 1918 to 1922.

He was also an elected member of the London School Board for Marylebone in 1897 and 1900, resigning in 1902.

In 1911, he addressed a meeting of the Young Scots Society in Clydebank and advocated for devolution of political power to Scotland due to what he saw as the congestion of business at Westminster, claiming that Parliament was no longer "a deliberative assembly in the true sense."

He was appointed a Privy Counsellor in 1916.

Sources
Who Was Who

 Works (Worldcat)Macdonald, J. A. Murray

References

External links 

1854 births
1939 deaths
People educated at the High School of Glasgow
Members of the Privy Council of the United Kingdom
UK MPs 1892–1895
UK MPs 1906–1910
UK MPs 1910
UK MPs 1910–1918
UK MPs 1918–1922
Members of the London School Board
Liberal Party (UK) MPs for English constituencies
Members of the Parliament of the United Kingdom for Stirling constituencies
Scottish Liberal Party MPs
National Liberal Party (UK, 1922) politicians